Alofi is an uninhabited island in the Pacific Ocean belonging to the French overseas collectivity (collectivité d'outre-mer, or COM) of Wallis and Futuna. Alofi was inhabited until 1840. The highest point on the island is Kolofau. The 3,500 ha island is separated from the larger neighbouring island of Futuna by a 1.7 km channel. Alofi has been recognised as an Important Bird Area (IBA) by BirdLife International for its red-footed booby colony and the vulnerable shy ground dove, as well as for various restricted-range bird species (including crimson-crowned fruit doves, blue-crowned lorikeets, Polynesian wattled honeyeaters, Polynesian trillers, Fiji shrikebills and Polynesian starlings).

References

Cartes institut géographique national (4902F)

Islands of Wallis and Futuna
Uninhabited islands of France
Volcanoes of the Pacific Ocean
Former populated places in Oceania
Important Bird Areas of Oceania
Important Bird Areas of Overseas France
Seabird colonies